Apollon Arnaia Football Club is a Greek football club, based in Arnaia, Chalkidiki.

The club was founded in 1933. They played in Football League 2 for the season 2014-15.

Honours

Domestic
 Chalkidiki Regional Championship: 3
 1980-81, 2009–10, 2013–14
 Chalkidiki Regional Cup: 4 
 1979-80, 2010–11, 2012–13, 2013-14

External links

Association football clubs established in 1933
1933 establishments in Greece